was a Japanese swimmer who competed in the 2000 Summer Olympics.

Death
He died on 4 September 2013 from stomach cancer.

References

1981 births
2013 deaths
Japanese male medley swimmers
Olympic swimmers of Japan
Swimmers at the 2000 Summer Olympics
Asian Games medalists in swimming
Swimmers at the 2002 Asian Games
Swimmers at the 2006 Asian Games
Asian Games silver medalists for Japan
Asian Games bronze medalists for Japan
Medalists at the 2002 Asian Games
Medalists at the 2006 Asian Games
Deaths from stomach cancer
Deaths from cancer in Japan
20th-century Japanese people
21st-century Japanese people